The 2015–16 EHF Women's Cup Winners' Cup was the forty edition of the tournament that is organized by the European Handball Federation for the domestic cup winners in the continent.

Round and draw dates

All draws held at the European Handball Federation headquarters in Vienna, Austria.

Qualification stage

Round 2
Teams listed first played the first leg at home. Some teams agreed to play both matches in the same venue. Bolded teams qualified into the third round.

|}
Notes
a Both legs were hosted by LK Zug Handball.
b Both legs were hosted by Mecalia Atletico Guardes.
c Both legs were hosted by Yenimahalle Bld. SK
d Both legs were hosted by WHC Radnicki Kragujevac.

Round 3
Teams listed first played the first leg at home. Some teams agreed to play both matches in the same venue. Bolded teams qualified into last 16.

|}
Notes

a Both legs were hosted by Team Tvis Holstebro.
b Both legs were hosted by SC Municipal Craiova.
c Both legs were hosted by ÉRD HC.
d Both legs were hosted by Mecalia Atletico Guardes.

Last 16
Teams listed first played the first leg at home. Bolded teams qualified into quarter-finals.

|}

Quarter-finals
Teams listed first played the first leg at home. Bolded teams qualified into semi-finals.

|}

Semi-finals
Teams listed first played the first leg at home. Bolded teams qualified into semi-finals.

|}

Finals
Teams listed first played the first leg at home.

|}

External links
 (official website)

Women's EHF Cup Winners' Cup
EHF Cup Winners' Cup Women
EHF Cup Winners' Cup Women